A Nest of Nightmares is a collection of horror stories by Lisa Tuttle published in 1986.

Stories
A Nest of Nightmares consists of 13 horror stories, all with female protagonists. 
 
  Bug House
  Dollburger
  Community Property
  Flying to Byzantium
  Treading the Maze
  The Horse Lord
  The Other Mother
  Need
  The Memory of Wood
  A Friend in Need
  Stranger in the House
  Sun City
  The Nest

Reception
Dave Langford reviewed A Nest of Nightmares for White Dwarf #78, and stated that "Tuttle writes well and knows just how to push the gooseflesh button. I'd say more, but it's difficult to type while trembling under the bedclothes." Jessica Amanda Salmonson described it as "the most significant book of its kind to take a consistently feminist approach to horror fiction".

References

1986 short story collections
American short story collections
British short story collections
Horror short story collections